"Fade" is a song by British music producer and DJ Jakwob, with vocals courtesy of Maiday. The song was released as a single on 15 March 2013 as a digital download in the UK.  The song peaked at number 35 on the UK Singles Chart.

Music video
A music video to accompany the release of "Fade" was first released onto YouTube and VEVO on 10 February 2013 at a total length of three minutes and twenty-six seconds. The music video was directed by Billy Boyd Cape and features a performance from Nicole O'Neill. In just 40 days the video peaked 1 million views. As of May 2020, its view count is over 3.5 million.

Track listing

Chart performance
On 24 March 2013 the song entered the UK Singles Chart at number 35, becoming his first top 40 single in the UK. On 14 April 2013 the song re-entered the Top 40 at 37.

Weekly charts

Release history

References

2013 singles
Jakwob songs
2013 songs
Trip hop songs